Calcasieu Parish is a parish located on the southwestern border of the U.S. state of Louisiana. As of the 2020 census, the population was 216,785. The parish seat is Lake Charles.

Calcasieu Parish is part of the Lake Charles metropolitan statistical area; it is also located near the Beaumont–Port Arthur (Texas), Lafayette, and Alexandria metropolitan areas.

Calcasieu Parish was created March 24, 1840, from the parish of Saint Landry, one of the original nineteen civil parishes established by the Louisiana Legislature in 1807 after the United States acquired the territory in the Louisiana Purchase of 1803. The original parish seat was Comasaque Bluff, a settlement east of the river and later called Marsh Bayou Bluff. On December 8, 1840, it was renamed as Marion, Louisiana.

In 1852 Jacob Ryan, a local planter and businessman, donated land and offered to move the courthouse in order to have the parish seat moved to Lake Charles. As the population in this area grew over the years, the original Calcasieu Parish has since been divided into five smaller parishes. The original area of Calcasieu Parish is called Imperial Calcasieu.

History
The name Calcasieu [p] comes from the Atakapa word, spelled quelqueshue in a French transliteration, and meaning "crying eagle." This was the name of an Atakapa chief, which French colonists applied to the local river, the Calcasieu River. When the Spanish controlled this area, they referred to this river as the Rio Hondo (Rio Stondo or "Deep River"). The Americans adopted an English transliteration of the French name for the parish. There is also some speculation that Calcasieu is simply an anglicized spelling of "quelque chose" (pronounced kel-ka-showz) which is French for "something". Potentially it being named "Something Parish" after "Something River".

Early history
The early history of the parish dates to the period of the Spanish occupation of Louisiana, after France had ceded this territory following its defeat by Great Britain in the Seven Years' War. In 1797, Jose M. Mora was granted a large tract of land between the Rio Hondo (now Calcasieu River) and the Sabine River, known for years as the "Neutral Strip" between Louisiana and Texas. The area became a refuge for outlaws and filibusters from Carolina, Georgia, and Mississippi of the United States, which had recently gained independence from Great Britain.

The territory was disputed for years between Spain and the United States after France had ceded Louisiana to the American government as part of the Louisiana Purchase of 1803. It was definitively acquired by the United States from Spain with the Adams-Onis Treaty in 1819. The treaty was formally ratified on February 22, 1821. By an act of Congress, approved on March 3, 1823, this strip of land was attached to the district of the Louisiana Territory south of the Red River.

Early settlers to the area included the Ryan, Perkin, Hodges, Bilbo, LeBleu, Deviers, and Henderson families. Some of these families also brought along a few enslaved servants. Acadian settlers, from the eastern parishes of Louisiana, also migrated to this area. Of French descent and exiled by the British from Acadia (eastern Canada), many of these refugees had settled in Louisiana. The parish had a diverse ethnic mix of French and Spanish Creoles, Acadians, Anglo-Americans, Enslaved African Americans, Free African Americans, and Indians. Data compiled from historical volumes of the US Center of Population and Housing indicate that in 1850, 240 of 3914 Parish residents were "Free Men of Color". By 1860 that number had risen to 305 of 5928. The 1860 U.S. census of Louisiana counts 1171 Slaves among Calcasieu Parish residents.

"Imperial Calcasieu" era 
Calcasieu Parish was created in 1840 from the Parish of Saint Landry. The new parish was the largest in the state, larger than either of the two smallest states, Delaware and Rhode Island. This size, which ultimately was divided into five parishes, led to the parish's nickname "Imperial Calcasieu."

On August 24, 1840, six men met at a private home near present-day Chloe to organize as the parish police jury representing six wards. The first order of business was to elect officers, appoint a parish clerk, and settle on simple parliamentary rules that would enable the president to keep the meetings orderly and progressive. The jury adopted all of the laws then in force in Saint Landry Parish. They appointed a parish constable, a parish treasurer, two parish assessors, and an operator of the ferry at Buchanan's crossing. The assessors were given two months to assess all of the property in the parish and a salary of $90.

On September 14, 1840, a survey was authorized of land known then as Marsh Bayou Bluff in order to establish a seat of justice (parish seat) and construct a courthouse and jail. On December 8, 1840, the jury chose to rename this community as Marion. In 1843, the Legislature authorized a vote to move the parish seat.

Finally in 1852, Jacob Ryan was successful in having the parish seat relocated from Marion to the east bank of Lake Charles. This parish seat was incorporated in 1857 as the town of Charleston; it was reincorporated in 1868 as Lake Charles. It is located about six miles (10 km) from Marion, now known as Old Town. The name Lake Charles commemorates one of the first European settlers, Charles Sallier, a Frenchman who acquired land in this area at the beginning of the 19th century.

Division 
In 1870 Cameron Parish was created from the southern portion of Imperial Calcasieu. It was one of several parishes organized during the Reconstruction era by the Republican-dominated legislature, in an effort to build Republican strength. Many Freedmen had joined the Republican Party elsewhere in the state. However, while other areas of Louisiana had been developed as cotton plantations, Calcasieu Parish had not. Although the parish had been larger in land mass than the states of Delaware and Rhode Island it was primarily utilized as grazing land for cattle with no significant plantings of cotton, sugar cane or other crops requiring the utilization of enslaved labor. Therefore, Calcasieu was home to a lower percentile of African Americans slaves than many other parts of the State.

These were the most recent parishes organized in Louisiana. Following these jurisdictional changes, Calcasieu Parish lost almost half of its population between the 1910 and 1920 United States census.

Geography

Major highways

  Interstate 10
  Interstate 210
  U.S. Highway 90
  U.S. Highway 165
  U.S. Highway 171
  Louisiana Highway 12
  Louisiana Highway 14
  Louisiana Highway 27

Adjacent counties and parishes
 Beauregard Parish  (north)
 Jefferson Davis Parish  (east)
 Cameron Parish  (south)
 Orange County, Texas  (west)
 Newton County, Texas  (northwest)

Major waterways
 Lake Charles
 Calcasieu River
 Intracoastal Canal
 Ouiski Chitto Creek
 English Bayou
 West Fork
 Calcasieu Lake

Communities

Cities 
 DeQuincy
 Lake Charles (parish seat and largest municipality)
 Sulphur
 Westlake

Towns 
 Iowa
 Vinton

Unincorporated areas

Census-designated places 
 Carlyss
 Gillis
 Hayes
 Moss Bluff
 Prien
 Starks

Unincorporated community 
 Mossville that was taken over by Sasol.

Demographics

According to the 2020 United States census, there were 216,785 people, 77,232 households, and 53,308 families residing in the parish. In 2010, 70.8% of the population were White, 24.9% Black or African American, 1.1% Asian, 0.5% Native American, 0.9% of some other race and 1.9% of two or more races. 2.6% were Hispanic or Latino (of any race); 24.9% were of French, French Canadian or Cajun, 8.4% American, 6.2% Irish, 6.2% English and 6.1% German ancestry. In 2020, the racial and ethnic makeup was 63.25% non-Hispanic white, 25.29% Black or African American, 0.42% Native American, 1.75% Asian, 0.06% Pacific Islander, 3.98% other or two or more races, and 5.25% Hispanic or Latino of any race.

In 2010, were 73,996 households, out of which 35.60% had children under the age of 18 living with them, 52.60% were married couples living together, 14.70% had a female householder with no husband present, and 28.50% were non-families. 24.00% of all households were made up of individuals, and 8.90% had someone living alone who was 65 years of age or older.  The average household size was 2.61 and the average family size was 3.11. 

In the parish, 27.40% of the population was under the age of 18, 10.30% from 18 to 24, 28.70% from 25 to 44, 21.80% from 45 to 64, and 11.90% was 65 years of age or older.  The median age was 34 years. For every 100 females there were 94.80 males.  For every 100 females age 18 and over, there were 91.30 males.

The median income for a household in the parish was $35,372, and the median income for a family was $41,903. Males had a median income of $36,569 versus $21,390 for females according to the 2010 census. The per capita income for the parish was $17,710. About 12.80% of families and 15.40% of the population were below the poverty line, including 19.90% of those under age 18 and 14.20% of those age 65 or over.

Law and government

Calcasieu Parish is governed by an elected body known as the Police Jury. Some 15 single-member districts have been defined, with a population of approximately 12,200 persons per district (based on the 2000 census). Each district elects one Juror for representation, in keeping with the ruling by the U.S. Supreme Court of the "one man, one vote" principle.

The Court had found that Louisiana and a number of other states had failed to reapportion their state legislatures for decades, in many cases keeping representation based on geographic boundaries, such as counties or parishes, rather than population. This had resulted in under-representation for decades of urban and industrialized districts in the state legislature. Redistricting was also required at the parish level for election of police juries. By the constitution, reapportionment (or redistricting) of the parish is required following each official census. This can change the boundaries of the single-member districts, to ensure that each Juror represents approximately the same number of people.

A 2003 report found that the office of the public defender in Calcasieu Parish used an expert in only 1 of 171 cases. The criminal defense lawyers in that parish visited their clients in jail in only 1 out of 14 cases.

Courthouse 
The first courthouse erected at Marion, a crudely built log cabin, was completed in August 1841. When the seat of justice was changed to Lake Charles in 1852, Sheriff Jacob Ryan with the help of his slave, Uncle George, and the aid of his good friend and fellow landowner, Samuel Adams Kirby, loaded the log cabin courthouse on an ox cart and transported the small building through the piney woods to Lake Charles. A new wooden courthouse was completed within a year.

This courthouse was replaced in 1891 by a colonial-style brick building erected at a cost of $20,000. In 1902 the parish added an annex to this building. A disastrous fire on April 23, 1910, destroyed the courthouse as well as most of downtown Lake Charles. Many of the records of the parish were burned or damaged. On April 4, 1911, the Police Jury decided to build a new courthouse on the old site.

It is a brick and terracotta structure completed in 1912 at a cost of $200,000. It is a replica of the famous Villa Copra, known as the Rotunda in Vicenza. The villa was designed by noted Italian architect, Andrea Palladio. His work became internationally known in the 17th and 18th centuries, and was influential both in Great Britain and the United States. Calcasieu Parish's replica was designed by Favrot and Livaudais of New Orleans. The dome atop the courthouse is of solid copper.

An annex containing two additional court rooms and additional space for the Clerk of Court and the Police Jury was added in the year 1958. Another annex for the Third Circuit Court of Appeals of the State of Louisiana was completed in 1960.

In 1967, a Parish Government Building was completed to house the various offices of the Police Jury.  This building was expanded in 2003, and houses the following departments: Office of the Parish Administrator, Records Department, Division of Finance/Purchasing, Facilities Management, Human Resources Department, Division of Planning and Development, Division of Engineering and Public Works, and the Government Access Channel.

In 1987, a new building was constructed to house the District Attorney's Office. A new state-of-the-art correctional center was completed in 1990 to replace the old jail, which was constructed in 1956. A separate building was completed in 1991 for the Third Circuit Court of Appeals. A Judicial Center was constructed on the site of the old jail to house the Fourteenth Judicial District, and was completed in March 1994.

Between 1993 and 1998 an extensive interior and exterior restoration and renovation was performed on the 1912 Parish Courthouse. The Courthouse houses several offices, including the Clerk of Court, Juvenile and Family Court, Registrar of Voters, Sheriff's Civil Division, Veterans Affairs Office, and others.

Law enforcement

The primary law enforcement for the parish is the Calcasieu Parish Sheriff's Office. In 2016, employees of the office were amongst the lowest-paid in the region.

The Louisiana State Police is the primary law enforcement on state highways within the parish.

Education
Public schools in all parts of the parish are operated by the Calcasieu Parish School Board.

It is in the service area of Sowela Technical Community College.

National Guard
Elements of the 256th IBCT and the 139TH RSG (Regional Support Group) are based in Lake Charles. The 256th IBCT deployed to Iraq twice, 2004-5 and 2010. De Quincy is the home of H Company of the 199th Forward Support Battalion which is a detachment of 3-156th Infantry Battalion. The Battalion's HHC is located in Lake Charles. These units deployed to Iraq with the 256TH IBCT.

Notable people
 Mark Abraham (born 1953), politician elected in 2015 as state representative for Calcasieu Parish, was sworn in January 2016.
 Ken Bahnsen (born 1930), former NFL fullback and collegiate football and tennis coach. Member of the Athletic Hall of Fame at the University of North Texas.
 Terry Burrows (Born 1968), former Major League Baseball pitcher and head baseball coach at McNeese State University.
 A.C. Clemons (1921–1992), Democratic politician elected to the Louisiana State Senate. He switched parties and became the first declared Republican member of the state senate since the Reconstruction era. His district included part of Calcasieu Parish.
 Casey Daigle (born 1981), former Major League Baseball pitcher. Husband of American Olympic gold medalist Jennie Finch.
 Mike Danahay, Democratic state representative for Calcasieu Parish since 2008; sales representative in Lake Charles; formerly resided in Sulphur and Vinton
Alvin Dark (1922-2014) former Major League Baseball player and manager
Michael E. DeBakey (1908-2008), heart surgeon; first person to successfully implant an artificial heart (1963); member of the Health Care Hall of Fame; recipient of the United Nations Lifetime Achievement Award, the Presidential Medal of Freedom with Distinction, and the National Medal of Science; originator of the M.A.S.H. unit concept.
 Sean Patrick Flanery (born 1965), is an American actor, author and martial artist.
 Dan Flavin (born 1957), Republican former member of the Louisiana House of Representatives from Calcasieu and Cameron parishes. He operates a real estate office in Lake Charles.
 1LT. Douglas B. Fournet (1943-1968), Medal of Honor recipient killed-in-action in the Vietnam War.
 Lether Frazar (1904–1960), university administrator, was the fourth president of McNeese State University, the second president of the University of Louisiana at Lafayette, and a former member of the Louisiana House of Representatives.
 Gilbert Franklin Hennigan (1883-1960), served in the Louisiana Senate from Allen, Beauregard, Calcasieu, Cameron, and Jeff Davis parishes from 1944 to 1956. He was born in Meadows in Calcasieu Parish and also lived in Beauregard Parish.
 Harry Hollins, state representative for Calcasieu Parish from 1964 to 1980.
 Ronnie Johns (born 1949), a State Farm Insurance agency owner in Sulphur who served in the Louisiana House of Representatives from 1996 to 2008; he was unopposed for the state senator from District 27 in 2011.
 Charlie Joiner (born 1947), former NFL wide receiver and member of the Pro Football Hall of Fame.
 Ralph Waldo Emerson Jones (1905-1982), former football and baseball coach and later president at Grambling State University.
 Robert G. "Bob" Jones (born 1939), a Lake Charles stockbroker, served in both houses of the Louisiana legislature between 1968 and 1976. He later switched to the Republican Party after running unsuccessfully in the 1975 gubernatorial primary.
 Sam Houston Jones (1897–1978), born and raised in nearby Beauregard Parish, he practiced law in Lake Charles for years prior to his election as governor in 1940.
 Eddie Kennison (born 1973), former LSU and NFL and wide receiver. Member of Louisiana Sports Hall of Fame.
 Bobby Kimball (born 1947), former lead singer and original member of the band Toto. 
 Tony Kushner (born 1956), Pulitzer Prize-winning playwright
 Conway LeBleu (1918-2007), a Lake Charles native who represented Cameron and part of Calcasieu parishes in the Louisiana House from 1964 to 1988.
 Zachary Levi (born 1980), American actor, comedian, and singer.
 Coleman Lindsey (1892–1968), born in a part of Calcasieu Parish that is now the Dry Creek community of Allen Parish. He was a state senator from Bossier and Webster parishes, lieutenant governor from 1939 to 1940, and a state court district judge in East Baton Rouge Parish from 1950 until his death.
 Nate Livings (born 1982), former NFL offensive lineman.
 Janice Lynde (born 1948), American actress and original cast member of The Young and the Restless.
 Ted Lyons (1900-1986), former Major League Baseball pitcher and manager. 1955 inductee to the Baseball Hall of Fame.
 Tommy Mason (1939-2015), former professional American Football player in the NFL. First overall pick of the 1961 NFL Draft.
 Dak Prescott (born 1993), current quarterback for the Dallas Cowboys of the NFL.
 Trey Quinn (born 1995), professional athlete for the Jacksonville Jaguars of the NFL.
 Rupert Richardson (1930-2008), African-American civil rights activist and civil rights leader who served as president of the National Association for the Advancement of Colored People (NAACP) from 1992 to 1995.
 Wilbert Rideau (born 1943), was a winner of the George Polk Award as editor of The Angolite, the Louisiana State Penitentiary's prisoner-produced newsmagazine.
 Guy Sockrider (1921-2011), businessman and state senator from Jennings and Lake Charles from 1948 to 1964
 Victor T. "Vic" Stelly (1941-2020), former Republican state representative from Calcasieu Parish and author of the Stelly Plan
 Martin Waldron (1925–1981), winner of the 1964 Pulitzer Prize for reporting on unchecked spending on the Florida Turnpike.

Politics

See also

 History of Lake Charles, Louisiana
 National Register of Historic Places listings in Calcasieu Parish, Louisiana

References

External links
 Calcasieu Parish Government's Website

Geology
 Heinrich, P. V., J. Snead, and R. P. McCulloh, 2002, Lake Charles 30 x 60 minute geologic quadrangle. Louisiana Geological Survey, Baton Rouge, Louisiana.

 
Louisiana parishes
Parishes in Acadiana
Louisiana placenames of Native American origin
Acadiana
County in the Lake Charles metropolitan area
1840 establishments in Louisiana
Populated places established in 1840